Joe Young (August 3, 1933 - February 27, 2019) was an American football defensive end in the early American Football League. He played professionally for the Denver Broncos during the 1960s.

Early life
Young was born in Chicago, Illinois and attended Thomas Kelly High School in Chicago. He played college football at Marquette University and the University of Arizona. He was named to the All-Border Conference in 1957.

Career
Young was drafted in the twenty-fourth round (287th pick overall) by the Chicago Bears in the 1955 NFL Draft. He played two seasons with the Denver Broncos of the American Football League in 1960 and 1961.

Later life
Young died on February 27, 2019, at the age of 85.

References

Players of American football from Chicago
Denver Broncos (AFL) players
American football defensive ends
Marquette Golden Avalanche football players
Arizona Wildcats football players
1933 births
2019 deaths